Victor Peter Chang, AC (born Chang Yam Him; 21 November 19364 July 1991), was a Chinese-born Australian cardiac surgeon and a pioneer of modern heart transplantation in Australia.  His sudden murder in 1991 stunned Australia, and is considered one of the most notorious in the country's history. Chang was given a state funeral, and in 1999, he was voted Australian of the Century at the People's Choice Awards.

After completing his medical studies at the University of Sydney and working in St Vincent's Hospital, he trained in the United Kingdom and the United States as a surgeon before returning to Australia. In St Vincent's Hospital, he helped establish the National Cardiac Transplant Unit, the country's leading centre for heart and lung transplants. Chang's team had a high success rate in performing heart transplantations and he pioneered the development of an artificial heart valve. In 1986, he was appointed a Companion of the Order of Australia for his "service to international relations between Australia and China and to medical science".

In 1991, Chang was murdered by two young men in a failed extortion attempt. His legacy includes setting up his own Foundation, the Victor Chang Foundation. Additionally, after his death the Victor Chang Cardiac Research Institute was created, and the Victor Chang Lowy Packer Building at St Vincent's Hospital was established.

Early life and education 
Chang was born in Shanghai to Australian-born Chinese British parents. He grew up in Hong Kong, where he attended primary school in Kowloon Tong and spent two years in St. Paul's College. Chang's father Aubrey sent him and his younger sister to Sydney in 1951 to stay with extended family. Chang attended Belmore Boys' High School in Belmore and completed his secondary education at Christian Brothers' High School in Lewisham. On 7 April 1948, Chang's mother died from breast cancer at the age of 33, prompting him to consider a career in medicine at the age of 12. He undertook his tertiary education at the University of Sydney, where he graduated with a Bachelor of Medical Science with First-Class Honours and a Bachelor of Medicine, Bachelor of Surgery in 1962.

Medical career

Medical training 
After completing his medical education, Chang interned at St Vincent's Hospital under the tutelage of cardiac surgeon Mark Shanahan who sent him to London to train with British surgeon Aubrey York Mason.

Chang became a Fellow of the Royal College of Surgeons in 1966 and trained in cardiothoracic surgery at the Royal Brompton Hospital. In London, he met and married his wife Ann (née Simmons).

Chang spent two years in the United States at the Mayo Clinic and became chief resident. In 1972, he returned to St Vincent's Hospital, where he was a consultant cardiothoracic surgeon and was appointed Fellow of the Royal Australasian College of Surgeons in 1973 and Fellow of the American College of Surgeons in 1975.

Surgical career 
In St Vincent's Hospital, he worked with surgeon Harry Windsor (who had performed Australia's first heart transplant in 1968) and Mark Shanahan. The advent of anti-rejection drugs in 1980 made heart transplants more feasible, and Chang lobbied politicians and businessmen to raise funds to establish a heart transplant program at St. Vincent's. On 8 April 1984, a team of doctors led by Chang operated on 14-year-old Fiona Coote who became Australia's youngest heart transplant patient.

Between 1984 and 1990, Chang's unit performed over 197 heart transplants and 14 heart-lung transplants. The unit had a high rate of success with 90% of those receiving transplants from the unit surviving beyond the first year. In 1986, Victor Chang was appointed a Companion of the Order of Australia (AC) "in recognition of service to international relations between Australia and China and to medical science".

Concerned about a shortage of organ donors, he arranged financing and assembled a team of scientists, engineers along with a marketing specialist to develop an artificial heart and manufacture inexpensive heart valves. Frank Tamru, the heart valve marketing and sales specialist met Dr. Chang in 1980 while working for Shiley the leading US company and based in Singapore. Along with engineers Richard Martin and Brij Gupta the group headquartered in Singapore set up facilities in Guangzhou and Sydney to developed mechanical and tissue heart valves called the St. Vincent's Heart Valves, which were widely implanted throughout Asia. The company, Pacific Biomedical Enterprises Ltd was the first in Asia to produce heart valves for Asian patients made by Asian workers. Chang and his team also made significant progress on the design of an artificial heart. His research projects ended with his death.

Death 

On the morning of 4 July 1991, Chang was shot twice in the head in a failed extortion attempt. His body was found slumped in the gutter next to his Mercedes-Benz 500SL in the Sydney suburb of Mosman.

Memorial
Chang was given a state funeral. Chang was cremated and his ashes were buried under a memorial plaque at Green Park, Darlinghurst, opposite St Vincent's Hospital. This is mentioned in the Victor Chang Cardiac Research Institute Website as a "tragic circumstance".

Murderers
Two Malaysian men, Chew Seng (Ah Sung) Liew and Choon Tee (Phillip) Lim,  picked Chang at random from a magazine featuring Asians who had 'made it good' in Australia. They ran their Toyota Corolla into Chang's vehicle, forcing him to pull over. After getting into an argument with Chang who refused to give them money, Liew fired the fatal shots. The first shot entered near the right cheek and exited below the right ear, while the fatal second, fired from point-blank range, entered the right temple and passed through the brain. Police investigators initially suspected the involvement of Triad syndicates, but later concluded the killing was an amateur act.

Trial 
Capital punishment in New South Wales was abolished in 1995.
Liew pleaded guilty and was sentenced to 26 years in prison with a non-parole period of 20 years. Lim, who pleaded not guilty and claimed he did not know Liew had a gun, received a minimum to maximum sentence of 18 to 24 years. Another man, Stanley Ng, abandoned an extortion plan a day before the murder. He had unsuccessfully tried detaining Chang twice to force him to give $3 million. Ng was granted immunity for his evidence. The prosecution alleged the plan had been to abduct Chang, tie him up with his family at his home in Clontarf, and threaten to hang them to coerce Chang into withdrawing money from the bank. In his ruling, Supreme Court Judge John Slattery stated, "It was an absurd, improbable plan, always doomed to failure".

On 26 October 2009, Lim was awarded parole. Following a public outcry and objection by the New South Wales Corrective Services Minister, John Robertson, his release was put on hold, pending another parole hearing. In the New South Wales Supreme Court, that decision was quashed due to the Parole Authority making a procedural error. Lim was freed from Parramatta Correctional Centre on 1 March 2010 into the custody of immigration officers waiting outside. He was to be deported back to Kuala Lumpur on 2 March, but the flight was cancelled for technical reasons. He was flown out of Australia on 3 March.

After 21 years in prison, Liew was granted parole. In his parole hearing, he made a broad apology for the crime and believed that his long term in prison had taken effect. There was a small outcry from NSW Attorney-General Greg Smith; however, this was retracted and Liew was released from prison on 12 October 2012 and was met by immigration officers. He was sent back to Malaysia the next day.

Legacy 

In 1984, Chang founded the Victor Chang Foundation to grant funds in two areas that he felt passionate about: education and innovation in the fields of cardiology and cardiothoracic surgery. The foundation continues today under the leadership of his daughter Vanessa Chang.

On 15 February 1994, the Victor Chang Cardiac Research Institute, a body intended to focus on researching "the prevention, diagnosis and treatment of heart muscle diseases", was launched by Prime Minister Paul Keating with Kerry Packer as its patron. The "Dr Victor Chang Science Labs" in Christian Brothers' High School are named after him. In 1999, Prime Minister John Howard announced Chang as Australian of the Century at the People's Choice Awards after a decision between two Australian larrikins and two lifesavers. Swimmer Dawn Fraser, cricketer Donald Bradman, and ophthalmologist Fred Hollows were other contenders.

In St Vincent's Hospital, the Victor Chang Lowy Packer Building was established in 2008 with $35 million from the state government and $45 million in corporate and private donations. Mary, Crown Princess of Denmark officially opened the building and declared that Chang "was an original thinker and saw the need for research and the development of heart assist devices and, not least, he is known for his legendary caring for his patients and their families". In Time magazine's "A Golden Anniversary" article, which lists people who have shaped the last "50 Years in the South Pacific" (1959–2009), Chang was listed as the figure of 1979–1989.

In 2017, a Sydney Ferries Emerald-class ferry was named Victor Chang.

Personal life 
Chang met his wife Ann Simmons in 1966. He was the on-call emergency physician at St. Anthony's Hospital in North Cheam, London, where Ann took herself after being taken unwell at a party. They had 3 children: Vanessa, Matthew, and Marcus.

Cars "provided a chance for Dad to get away from it all; they were his hobby and his opportunity to relax", He restored a 1950's MG TF, and enjoyed the opportunity to vigorously drive many cars, including his 1982 Citroën CX Prestige and several Porsches.

Chang had two younger siblings: sister Frances and brother Anthony. He was irreligious but was known to ask Sister Bernice to say a prayer for his patients and was known for his compassion.

References

Further reading 
 
 
 
 Margaret Harris, "Chang, Victor Peter (1936–1991)", Obituaries Australia, National Centre of Biography, Australian National University

External links 
 Victor Chang Cardiac Research Institute
 Victor Chang Foundation
 Victor Chang publications on PubMed

1936 births
1991 deaths
20th-century Australian medical doctors
Alumni of St. Paul's College, Hong Kong
Australian cardiac surgeons
Australian medical researchers
Australian murder victims
Australian people of Chinese descent
Companions of the Order of Australia
Deaths by firearm in New South Wales
Murder in Sydney
People from Shanghai
People murdered in Sydney
Sydney Medical School alumni
20th-century surgeons